Ferreyros is a surname. Notable people with the surname include:

Arturo Ferreyros (1924–2007), Peruvian basketball player
Eduardo Ferreyros Kuppers (born 1959), Peruvian politician
Ismael Benavides Ferreyros (born 1945), Peruvian politician